Harry Denyer Francis (July 28, 1921 – May 2, 1987) was a Canadian politician. He served in the Legislative Assembly of British Columbia briefly in 1952 from the electoral district of Similkameen, a member of the Social Credit party. He later resigned his seat in order for then-unelected finance minister Einar Maynard Gunderson to run for a seat in the legislature. At the time of his initial election, he was a minister, and the pastor at the Osoyoos Pentecostal Church in Osoyoos, British Columbia. He later worked in Revelstoke, British Columbia following his resignation. He died in 1987 following a cerebral hemorrhage.

References

1921 births
1987 deaths